Keith H. M. Luuloa (born December 24, 1974) is an American former professional baseball player who played one season for the Anaheim Angels of Major League Baseball (MLB). He played at Modesto Junior College in Modesto, California.

References
, or Baseball Almanac, or Retrosheet, or Venezuela Winter League, or SABR BioProject Article

1974 births
Living people
American expatriate baseball players in Canada
Anaheim Angels players
Arizona League Angels players
Baseball players from Honolulu
Bridgeport Bluefish players
Edmonton Trappers players
Huntsville Stars players
Indianapolis Indians players
Iowa Cubs players
Lake Elsinore Storm players
Leones del Caracas players
American expatriate baseball players in Venezuela
Major League Baseball infielders
Midland Angels players
Modesto Pirates baseball players
New Orleans Zephyrs players
Portland Beavers players
Vancouver Canadians players
Native Hawaiian sportspeople